Lord Boyle or Baron Boyle may refer to:

In the Peerage of Ireland:
Baron Boyle of Youghal, created in 1616, later merged with the Earldom of Cork
Baron Boyle of Broghill, created in 1628, later merged with the Earldom of Orrery
Baron Boyle of Bandon Bridge, created in 1628, later merged with the Earldom of Cork
Baron Boyle, created in 1673 with the Viscountcy of Blessington
In the Peerage of Scotland:
Lord Boyle of Kelburn, created in 1699, later merged with the Earldom of Glasgow
Lord Boyle of Stewartoun, created in 1703 with the Earldom of Glasgow
In the Peerage of Great Britain:
Baron Boyle of Marston, created in 1711 for the Earl of Orrery
In the Peerage of the United Kingdom:
Baron Boyle of Handsworth, created in 1970
As a judicial title:
David Boyle, Lord Boyle, so styled from 1811 to 1837